Carposina telesia is a moth in the family Carposinidae. It was described by Edward Meyrick in 1910. It is found in Australia, where it has been recorded from Western Australia.

References

Carposinidae
Moths described in 1910
Moths of Australia